Jalan Daan Mogot is one of the main avenues in Jakarta, Indonesia. The road is named after a military officer involved in the struggle for Indonesian independence Daan Mogot. This road stretches along 27.5 KM from Grogol, West Jakarta to Sukarasa, Tangerang, Tangerang. After entering Tangerang, this road continues to Jalan Merdeka and Jalan Gatot Subroto (Jalan Raya Serang).This road is part of  Indonesian National Route 1. This road crosses 14 urban villages, namely

Sukarasa, Tangerang, Tangerang
Suka Asih, Tangerang, Tangerang
Tanah Tinggi, Tangerang, Tangerang
Batuceper, Tangerang
Kebon Besar, Batuceper, Tangerang
Kalideres, West Jakarta
West Cengkareng, Cengkareng, West Jakarta
East Cengkareng, Cengkareng, West Jakarta
Kedaung Kali Angke, Cengkareng, West Jakarta
Wijaya Kusuma, Grogol Petamburan, West Jakarta
Kedoya Utara, Kebon Jeruk, West Jakarta
Duri Kepa, Kebon Jeruk, West Jakarta
Jelambar, Grogol Petamburan, West Jakarta
Tanjung Duren Utara, Grogol Petamburan, West Jakarta

Intersection 
There are tweleve intersections, they are:

Taruna Heroes Cemetery Street Intersection
Pembangunan 3 Street and Jenderal Sudirman Street (Tangerang) Intersection
Entrance/Exit of the Cengkareng–Batu Ceper–Kunciran section of Jakarta Outer Ring Road 2
Maulana Hassanusin Street Intersection
Peta Selatan Street Intersection
Tampak Siring Street Intersection
Cengkareng Intersection, to Lingkar Luar Barat Street and Jakarta Outer Ring Road 1
Dharma Wanita IV Street Intersection
Intersection to Casa Jardin Residence (Indosat Ooredoo Hutchison Satellite Station)
Panjang Raya Street Intersection
Pangeran Tubagus Angke Street Intersection
Grogol Intersection, to Prof. Dr. Latumenen Street (north), Kyai Tapa Street (east), and Letjen S. Parman Street (south)

Transportation

Bus Routes

TransJakarta 
This road is passed by TransJakarta corridor 3 (from Kalideres to Jelambar BRT Station). It is also served by APTB, Mayasari Bakti and Kopaja buses. There are nine BRT stations:

Sorted from west to east

 Pesakih
 Sumur Bor
 Rawa Buaya
 Jembatan Baru
 Dispenda Samsat Baru
 Jembatan Gantung (temporarily closed for renovation since September 5, 2022)
 Taman Kota
 Indosiar, near the Indosiar TV Studio
 Jelambar

Transjakarta routes that serves the Daan Mogot street are:

 BRT Corridor
  Kalideres–Pasar Baru
  Lebak Bulus–Harmoni Central
 Cross-corridor routes
  Rawa Buaya–Pulo Gadung 1
  Kalideres–ASMI
 3F Kalideres–Gelora Bung Karno

Other buses 
Besides Transjakarta, here are the list of bus services that passes the Daan Mogot Street

 Mayasari Bakti
 AC42A Kalideres-Cileungsi (via Daan Mogot - Grogol - Slipi - Tol - Tol Cibubur)
 Angkot
 Kalideres-Serpong (via Daan Mogot - Poris Plawad - Cikokol - Serpong Raya - Muncul)
 Cengkareng-Cikokol (via Daan Mogot - Poris Plawad - Cikokol)
 Kalideres-Kotabumi
 Kalideres-Cadas
 Cikokol-Dadap (via Jend. Sudirman - Poris Plawad - Daan Mogot - Halim Perdanakusuma - Husein Sastranegara - Raya Prancis - Villa Taman Bandara)

See also

Daan Mogot
KH Hasyim Asy'ari Grand Mosque
History of Jakarta

References

Roads of Jakarta